Paracles tapina is a moth of the subfamily Arctiinae first described by Harrison Gray Dyar Jr. in 1913. It is found in Peru.

References

Moths described in 1913
Paracles